The Marin Municipal Water District (or MMWD) is the government agency that provides drinking water to southern and central Marin County, California. Chartered in 1912, it became California's first municipal water district. It serves 191,000 customers in a  area that includes ten towns and cities.

Background 
The Marin Municipal Water District provides clean water to about 190,000 residents and businesses in the central and southern parts of Marin County. The water district controls and protects over 21,000 acres of valuable watershed land. This watershed leads to seven different reservoirs that can be found on Mount Tamalpais and West Marin.

Marin's water district delivers an average of 22 million gallons of water per day through its 900+ miles of pipelines and 99 pumping stations. All of this water is processed through two water treatment plants and one finishing plant.
About 75% of the districts water supply come from rainfall on Mt. Tamalpais watershed and in the grassy hills of west Marin. The rainwater flow into the 7 reservoirs of Marin.

As of 2022, the average water storage is up 106.90% than compared to 2021. The current storage is 59,046 AF (acre-feet) compared to the storage of 2021, which was 27,557AF for this date.

Reservoirs
The district's seven reservoirs in Marin County provide about 75% of the water it uses:
 Alpine Lake, formed by Alpine Dam on Lagunitas Creek
 Bon Tempe Lake on Lagunitas Creek
 Kent Lake, formed by Peters Dam on Lagunitas Creek
 Lake Lagunitas on Lagunitas Creek
 Nicasio Reservoir, formed by Seeger Dam on Nicasio Creek
 Phoenix Reservoir
 Soulajule Reservoir on Arroyo Sausal

Combined, these seven reservoirs have a capacity of 79,566 acre-feet (98.14 million m3). Alpine, Bon Tempe, Kent, Lagunitas, and Phoenix are all part of the Mount Tamalpais watershed.

The district's remaining 25% of water is sourced from Sonoma County's Russian River water system.

Recreation
Over  of land in District ownership are open to the public for recreational use from sunrise to sunset. The Cataract Falls Trail is one of the most popular trails. Many of the trails are also open for dog walking and horseback riding, while bicycling is only allowed on fire roads. Portions of the seven District reservoirs are open for hiking, biking, horseback riding, fishing, and picnicking. Camping, swimming, and boating are prohibited.

Fisheries 
MMWD is commonly recognized as a leader in the area for salmon conservation. There are various programs dedicated to monitor salmon populations and enhance their natural habitats such as Lagunitas Creek Stewardship Plan and the Watershed Stewards Program. Lagunitas Creek is home to one of the last and largest remaining populations of Central California Coast coho salmon as it is a spawning and rearing ground for the endangered species of coho salmon and steelhead trout.

Wildlife 
There are over 400 species living in the Mt. Tamalpais watershed. These species include rare, threatened, and even endangered animals. MMWD supports a variety of programs that are in place to help monitor the ecosystem health, species presence, and population trends over time. Some of these programs in place to help sustain and monitor species such as the northern spotted owl, the yellow-legged frog, and the western pond turtle.

Employment 
The water district sustains various employees at both full time, part time, and seasonal levels. It currently has about 240 full time employees who are governed by a five-member board of directors. Full time employees qualify for a benefits package after six months of employment.

Administration
Its administrative offices are located at 220 Nellen Avenue in Corte Madera.

See also
 Santa Clara Valley Water District
 Sonoma County Water Agency
 Water in California

References

External links
 

Government of Marin County, California
Water management authorities in California
County government agencies in California
Mount Tamalpais
1912 establishments in California
Government agencies established in 1912